Esther Nara Yoon (born November 7, 1987), better known by her stage name Esna (stylized as eSNa), is a Korean-American singer-songwriter active in South Korea. Her first extended play, eSNa The Singer, was released in October 2015. She has also written songs for other artists, including the 2014 hit single "Some".

Career
Esna was born in Los Angeles, California and graduated from UCLA, where she studied jazz vocals. She started her music career by uploading cover songs on YouTube, and moved to South Korea in 2010. In 2011, she was a contestant on the singing competition program Superstar K3 (under her Korean name, Yoon Bitnara), and was eliminated during the rival mission. She was eventually signed to WA Entertainment (now Rainbow Bridge World). She said she had a difficult time until she "accepted Korea as [her] home" in 2013. That same year, she formed a collaboration project with Kero One, named Kesna Music. Their single "Is It Love?" was released in July 2013. Her first solo release in South Korea was the song "Bite My Lower Lips" for the soundtrack of the television drama The Heirs, released in October. "Mistletoe", a Christmas collaboration with Geeks and Phantom, co-written by Esna, was released in December.

As a songwriter, her breakthrough was the song "Some", written for Soyou and Junggigo (featuring Lil Boi of Geeks), released in February 2014. Esna wrote the song with her agency's CEO, Kim Do-hoon, and Min Yeon-jae, Xepy, Lil Boi and Junggigo. It spent six weeks at the top of the Billboard Korea K-Pop Hot 100, tying the all-time chart record. In an interview, she said the song was "unintentionally easy to write" and was partly based on her own experiences. Most of Esna's compositions are inspired by R&B, jazz and swing, including Wheesung and Gummy's "Special Love" and songs written for RBW's girl group Mamamoo. Esna was credited as a songwriter for four songs on Mamamoo's debut album Hello and co-composed both songs on Piano Man. On one song, "Gentleman", Esna also sang in collaboration with Mamamoo.

In March 2015, Esna and Seulong released the song "Destiny", for the soundtrack of the television drama Hogu's Love. It was written and produced by Esna, and was the main theme for Seulong's character in the drama. In April, Esna and Mamamoo released the collaboration single "Ahh Oop!", from Mamamoo's album Pink Funky. The song was written by Esna, with lyrics telling men to stop using cliché pick-up lines and treat women with respect. It was promoted on music shows for two weeks and had an accompanying music video produced and directed by Digipedi. After the song's release, Esna received derisive comments about her appearance from Korean netizens. She then released a remake of the song, titled "Ahh Shit!", which includes the lyrics "All my ladies out there, you’re beautiful just the way you are". The remake received a positive review, and Esna stated that she wants to change the image-focused nature of K-pop.

On October 22, 2015, Esna released her first extended play, eSNa The Singer. It contains the previously released single "A Little Lovin" and a solo version of "Ahh Oop!", as well as the single "Me, Today". "Me, Today" features San E on the Korean version of the song, and Flowsik on the English version. Esna held a "listening party" at the D Bridge club in Cheongdam-dong to celebrate the album's release.

In April 2016, Esna became the DJ for the Arirang Radio program Sound K.

Discography

Extended play

Singles

Other Appearances

Songwriting for other artists

References

External links

Living people
1987 births
American women singer-songwriters
Korean-language singers of the United States
K-pop singers
Superstar K participants
South Korean female idols
American YouTubers
21st-century American singers
21st-century American women singers